Jason Hale may refer to:
 Jason Hale (actor) (born 1971), American actor, theatre director, and teacher
 Jason Hale (politician) (born 1969), Canadian politician